Roberto Castelli (born 12 July 1946) is an Italian politician. He was the Minister of Justice in the second and third governments of Silvio Berlusconi. He has been one of the main representatives of the Northern League.

Early life and education
Castelli was born in Lecco 12 July 1946. He holds a degree in mechanic engineering.

Career 
Castelli is an engineer, and has been in politics with the Lega Nord since 1986. In 1992, Castelli was elected to the Chamber of Deputies and was re-elected in 1994. From 1996 to 2013 he was a member of the Senate, and for two years (1999–2001) he was chairman of parliamentary group of the Northern League in the Senate, as he is now.

Minister of Justice 

In fall 2004, he completed a highly controversial reform of the judiciary, but initially President Carlo Azeglio Ciampi, even though he had been pressured by Castelli to do so, refused to sign the bill. The law was passed again in spring 2005.

As a minister, he refused to sign President Ciampi's decision to pardon Adriano Sofri, leading to a conflict of powers in which the President has tried to reassert its exclusive competence in the matter (as stated in article 87 of the Constitution of Italy), and the minister claimed that he had the right to object. He also refused to request the extradition of 22 alleged CIA agents from the United States who were implicated in the kidnapping and torture of Hassan Mustafa Osama Nasr. On 13 December 2012, Castelli said during the satirical talk show of  Rai Radio 2 "Un giorno da pecora"  he will not seek re-election to the 2013 Italian general election.

References 

1946 births
Living people
Polytechnic University of Milan alumni
People from Lecco
Government ministers of Italy
Lega Nord politicians
Italian Ministers of Justice